The Eaglet (French:L'aiglon) is a 1913 French silent historical film directed by Emile Chautard. It is an adaptation of the play L'Aiglon by Edmond Rostand, which portrays the life of Napoleon II.

Cast
 Pépa Bonafé 
 Emile Chautard as Napoleon Bonaparte  
 Marie-Louise Derval 
 Maxime Desjardins
 Catherine Fonteney 
 Philippe Garnier 
 Paul Guidé 
 Jacques Guilhène 
 Emmy Lynn 
 Maxime Léry 
 Jules Mondos 
 Louis Ravet
 Henry Roussel

References

Bibliography 
 Abel, Richard. The Ciné Goes to Town: French Cinema, 1896-1914. University of California Press, 1998.

External links 
 

1913 films
French silent films
French historical films
1910s historical films
1910s French-language films
Films directed by Emile Chautard
Films set in the 1810s
Films set in the 1820s
Films set in the 1830s
Films based on works by Edmond Rostand
French films based on plays
Depictions of Napoleon on film
French black-and-white films
1910s French films